Mambila is a dialect chain stretching across Nigeria and Cameroon. It is one of the Mambiloid languages, a branch of Benue–Congo.

Notable dialects are Barup, Bang, Dorofi, Gembu, Hainari, Kabri, Mayo Ndaga, Mbamnga, Tamien, Warwar (in Nigeria); Sunu Torbi (Torbi), Ju Naare (Gembu), and in Cameroon, Ju Ba and Langa. Mambila goes by numerous names, which, besides the dialectical names, include Bea, Ble, Juli, Lagubi, Nor, Nor Tagbo, Tongbo, and the spellings Mabila, Mambere, Mambilla.

Tep is generally considered a dialect by those in Tep and by speakers of other varieties of Mambila, but though Tep speakers are ethnically Mambila, their speech is not intelligible to other varieties. In terms of linguistic classification it may be more accurate to call it a different Mambiloid  language. See Connell references below.

Blacksmiths among the Mambila once spoke Somyev, a related Mambiloid language, though this is nearly extinct.

Phonology

Vowels 

 /i/ can also be heard as [ɪ] in different positions.

There is an occurrence of fricativized close vowel combinations when preceded by a number of consonants. An alveolo-palatal fricative with vowels /i, ɨ/ as [ʑ͜i, ʑ͜ɨ], and a labio-dental sound with /ɯ/ as [v͜ɯ]. The only consonants /b, f, t, d, n, l, ʃ, k/ are heard with the fricativized vowels [bʑ, ʃʑ, fv, tv, dv, nv, lv, kv].

Consonants 

 /d/ can have allophones of [ɾ, r, ɺ], among different speakers. /k/ can have an allophone of [x] when occurring in intervocalic or post-vocalic positions.

References

 Connell, Bruce. 1998. Moribund languages of the Nigeria-Cameroon borderland. In Endangered Languages in Africa, edited by M. Brenzinger. Köln: Rüdiger Köppe.
 Connell, Bruce. 2000. The Integrity of Mambiloid. In Proceedings of WOCAL97 (Second World Congress of African Linguistics), edited by E. Wolff. Köln: Rüdiger Köppe Verlag.
 Connell, Bruce. 2010. Language Ecology and Language Endangerment: an Instance from the Nigeria-Cameroon Borderland. Journal of West African Languages XXXVII (1):1—11.
 Connell, Bruce, Zeitlyn, David, Griffiths, Sascha, Hayward, Laura and Marieke Martin. 2021. "Language ecology, language endangerment, and relict languages: Case studies from Adamawa (Cameroon-Nigeria)" Open Linguistics 7(1): 244-300. https://doi.org/10.1515/opli-2021-0011 https://www.degruyter.com/document/doi/10.1515/opli-2021-0011/html

Mambiloid languages
Languages of Nigeria
Languages of Cameroon